Maltravers Herald of Arms Extraordinary is a current officer of arms extraordinary in England.  As such, Maltravers is a royal herald, but is not a member of the College of Arms in London.  The present office was created in 1887 by the Earl Marshal, who was also the Duke of Norfolk and Baron Maltravers.  The office is known to have been held by a pursuivant to Lord Maltravers when he was deputy of Calais from 1540 to 1544.  The badge is blazoned as A Fret Or.  It was officially assigned in 1973, though it had been assumed by two Maltravers Heralds in the 1930s.  It derives from the coat of arms of Maltravers Sable a Fret Or and a Label of the points Ermine, and was the badge of John, Earl of Arundel through which family the barony passed to the Howard dukes of Norfolk. 

The current Maltravers Herald of Arms Extraordinary is John Martin Robinson, MA (St Andrews) DPhil (Oxford) FSA.

Holders of the office

See also
 Heraldry
 Officer of Arms

References
Citations

Bibliography
 The College of Arms, Queen Victoria Street : being the sixteenth and final monograph of the London Survey Committee, Walter H. Godfrey, assisted by Sir Anthony Wagner, with a complete list of the officers of arms, prepared by H. Stanford London, (London, 1963)
 A History of the College of Arms &c, Mark Noble, (London, 1804)

External links
The College of Arms
CUHGS Officer of Arms Index

English offices of arms